Air Malta plc (stylized as airmalta) is the flag carrier airline of Malta, with its headquarters in Luqa and its hub at Malta International Airport.  It operates services to destinations in Europe, the Middle East and North Africa.

History

Early years
Shortly after the Second World War, several small private airlines were formed in Malta. Amongst these were The Malta Instone Airline, BAS (Malta) Ltd, and Malta Airlines. In 1947, the former two companies merged to form Air Malta Ltd in fierce competition with the latter. Eventually in 1951 Malta Airlines absorbed the operations of Air Malta Ltd and continued operating through an agreement with BEA until 1973. The owners of Air Malta Ltd used their real estate, staff, and equipment to set up a ground handling company called MAS, Malta Aviation Services.

In the early 1970s, the Maltese government appointed Albert Mizzi as chairman of the airline and made a call for an international airline partner to help set up an airline. The name chosen for the new airline was similar to that of its forerunner, Air Malta Co Ltd, and was established on 31 March 1973. BEA was chartered to continue its Malta operations, this time for Air Malta, until Air Malta's first flight on 1 April 1974. Both Malta Airlines and Malta Aviation Services were taken over by the government and the private owners were given a shareholding in Air Malta Co. Ltd.

Air Malta started operations, with two wet leased Boeing 720Bs that served Rome, Tripoli, London, Manchester, Frankfurt, and Paris from Malta. It later bought three more Boeing 720Bs and bought the original two.

In 1981, three Boeing 737-200s were wet leased, which were so successful that in 1983, three new fully owned Boeing 737-200s were delivered. In 1986, Air Malta bought three new Boeing 737-200s, and in 1987 ordered its first Airbus A320. In 1989, Air Malta exercised an option for one more A320, and in 1992, three more Boeing 737-300s were ordered and four Avro RJ70s were ordered for routes to Catania and Palermo, and to new destinations such as Tunis and Monastir.

After the opening of Malta International Airport in 1992, Air Malta created CargoSystems, which includes the transportation of cargo on Air Malta planes. In 1994, Air Malta inaugurated a cargo center at the airport. It was also during this time that a codesharing agreement with Trans World Airlines began.

21st century development

Between 2002 and 2007, Air Malta embarked upon a fleet replacement programme, opting to change all aircraft to Airbus A319s and A320s. The last aircraft in this order, an A320, was delivered on 22 March 2007, and the fleet has not been replaced since.

Air Malta had around 190 interline ticketing agreements with other IATA airlines. According to the Association of European Airlines quarterly review of May 2006, Air Malta is the airline that lost the least amount of passenger baggage. The amount of baggage lost in the first quarter of 2006 was 4.1 bags missing per 1000 passengers.

In winter, the airline often leases out aircraft to maximise earnings during the low season. In September 2007, for instance, Air Malta made two agreements with Abu Dhabi-based Etihad Airways by which Air Malta wet-leased 2 Airbus aircraft to Etihad Airways for the winter period starting 1 September 2007, and provided operational support on another Airbus A320 aircraft leased by Etihad Airways. In January and February 2009 Air Malta wet-leased an A320 to Sky Airline of Chile. From 2011 to 2014 Air Malta wet-leased another A320 to Sky Airline.

In 2012 Air Malta underwent a re-branding process, which caused some controversy as the titles on aircraft and signage only say Malta, omitting the word Air. The airline insisted this was not a name change, and the full name of the airline remains Air Malta. Additionally, the titles on the engines still say airmalta.com. The first plane to show off the new colours was the Airbus A320-200 9H-AEN at the Malta International Airshow 2012. On the second and last day of the show the A320 and a Spitfire performed a flypast as the closing act.

As a commemoration of the airline's 40 years of operation, the airline painted one of its aircraft, 9H-AEI, an A320-200, in retro colours, depicting the livery used on the Boeing 720Bs.

In June 2017, the newly appointed Minister for Tourism announced the restructuring of Air Malta. This was also confirmed by the newly appointed chairman. Air Malta then opened a number of new routes, including Tunis, Malaga (reduced to seasonal in 2019), Comiso (terminated after summer 2018), Kiev, Lisbon, Casablanca, Southend (terminated in 2019) and Cagliari (subsequently reduced to June–September only). Manchester and Frankfurt were restarted after being briefly terminated.

In March 2019, the airline announced that it had made a profit of €1.2 million in the fiscal year of 2018. This profit is the first the airline has made in 18 years.

On 1 April 2019, Air Malta celebrated 45 years since it commenced its first operations. Currently the airline is restructuring, and aims to increase its fleet to 14 aircraft. The restructuring plans include the replacement of the current fleet with newer Airbus A320 Neo aircraft, as well as inaugural flights to Asia and North America with Airbus A321LR aircraft.

During post-COVID period, Air Malta has been known to struggling financially. Air Malta was reportedly facing a loss of €30 Million, a year after recording profit for first time in 18 years. Redundancies are currently in the pipeline as Air Malta faces uncertainty and it plans to lay off a large chunk of its workforce. According to a Times of Malta article dated on 24 April 2020, ALPA, which is the union's airline pilot association refused outright an offer placed for its pilots to be set on a 1,200 Euros monthly pay due to COVID-19's impact on shutting down the international airport in Malta which happened on 3 May and bringing visitors levels to below 0.2% affecting Air Malta directly.

In August 2022, the Maltese government announced it would dissolve Air Malta should the European Union deny further financial state aid to the airline. It would then relocate its assets to a succeeding carrier. Shortly after, the decision regarding the airline's future had been delayed to the end of 2022; however, the route network and frequencies saw extensive cuts by October 2022, including the termination of several destinations.

Corporate affairs
The head office of the company is on Level 2 of the Skyparks Business Centre, located on the property of Malta International Airport in Luqa. In the 1960s and 1970s the head office of predecessor Malta Airlines was in Sliema.

Destinations

Codeshare agreements
Air Malta codeshares with the following airlines:

 Aeroflot
 airBaltic
 Air France
 Air Serbia
 Austrian Airlines
 Brussels Airlines
 Czech Airlines
 Emirates
 Etihad Airways
 ITA Airways
 KLM
 Lufthansa
 Qatar Airways
 Swiss International Air Lines
 Turkish Airlines

Fleet

Current fleet
, Air Malta operates the following aircraft:

Former fleet
Air Malta previously operated the following jet aircraft:
 Airbus A319-100
 Avro RJ70
 Boeing 720B
 Boeing 727-200
 Boeing 737-200
 Boeing 737-300
 Boeing 737-400
 Convair 880

Incidents and accidents
Since its inception in 1973, Air Malta has had no fatal accidents.
On 31 October 1981, after a Boeing 737-200 landed in Cairo, Egypt, two bombs exploded, injuring four people. A third bomb that failed to detonate was found later.
On 9 June 1997, Air Malta Flight 830, a Boeing 737-200, was hijacked by two Turks on a flight from Malta to Istanbul, Turkey. They demanded the release of Mehmet Ali Ağca. The hijack ended in Cologne, Germany, with no casualties amongst the 74 passengers and six crew.
On 31 December 2022, Air Malta Flight KM377, operating from Berlin, suffered a bird strike. This caused the aircraft to land back immediately after the incident.

References

External links

Official website

 
Airlines of Malta
Association of European Airlines members
Government-owned airlines
Airlines established in 1973
Maltese brands
1973 establishments in Malta
Luqa